Malta has a Subtropical-Mediterranean climate according to the Köppen climate classification (Csa), with very mild winters and warm to hot summers. Rain occurs mainly in winter, with summer being generally dry. According to the Troll-Paffen climate classification and the Siegmund/Frankenberg climate classification, Malta lies within the subtropical zone, being at 35ºN latitude.

Temperature 

However even in the winter months of the year (December, January, February) temperatures sometimes reach , March is transitional, with warmer temperatures, daily maximums often exceed  and lows are already in the 2 digits (above ) since early March. In Malta, large fluctuations in temperature are rare.

Daylight 
Malta enjoys one of the most optimal arrangement of hours of daylight in Europe. Days in winter are not as short as in the northern part of the continent, the average hours of daylight in December, January and February is 10.3 hours (for comparison: London or Moscow or Warsaw – about 8 hours). The shortest day of the year – 21 December – sunrise is around 7:00 and sunset is around 17:00. The longest day of the year – 21 June – sunrise is around 5:30 and sunset is around 20:30.

Sunshine 
As one might expect from Malta's high daylight hours, Malta enjoys around 3,000 hours of sunshine per year (also one of the highest in Europe), from an average of above 5 hours of sunshine per day in December to an average of above 12 hours of sunshine per day in July. Thus, Malta enjoys about twice the amount of sunshine as cities in the northern half of Europe. For comparison, London has 1,461 hours per year; however, in winter Malta has much more sunshine. For comparison, London has 37 hours while Malta has 161 hours of sunshine in December.

Sea temperature 
In the 6 months from June to November, the average sea temperature exceeds .

Precipitation 
Water supply poses a problem on Malta, as the summer is both rainless and the time of greatest water use, and the winter rainfall often falls as heavy showers running off to the sea rather than soaking into the ground. Malta depends on underground reserves of fresh water, drawn through a system of water tunnels such as the Ta' Kandja galleries or the Ta' Bakkja tunnels, which average about 97 m below surface and extend like the spokes of a wheel. In the galleries in Malta's porous limestone, fresh water lies in a lens upon brine. More than half the potable water of Malta is produced by desalination, which creates further issues of fossil fuel use and pollution.

Malta has an average of 90 precipitation days a year, and experiences from a few to a dozen rainy days per month (≥ 1 mm), ranging from 0.5 of a day in July to around 15 in December. The average annual precipitation is around 600 mm, ranging from ≈0.3 mm in July to ≈110 mm in December.

Humidity 
The annual average relative humidity is high, averaging 76%, ranging from 69% in July (morning: 78% evening: 53%) to 79% in December (morning: 83% evening: 73%).

Records

Despite the relative stasis of the Maltese climate, historical records present some variations.

Snow is a very rare phenomenon, there was a snowfall reported in January 1858, March 1877 (light snow without accumulation), February 1895 (snow without accumulation), January 1905 (flurries without accumulation), March 1949 (snow recorded in the interior of the island), and 31 January 1962, On 31 December 2014 snow was reported at various locations. though the Met Office later confirmed this was actually Graupel or soft hail. It is thought that many historical reports of "snowfall" were likely also Graupel. That Winter went on to be one of the coldest and stormiest ever experienced in the Maltese Islands.

June 2021 recorded a very rare type of heatwave.

Climate data

See also
Malta 2021 Stratospheric Balloon, upper-atmosphere weather balloon

References

Malta
Malta